Andriy Oleksandrovych Oberemko (born 8 March 1984) is a Ukrainian professional association football player.

Oberemko was born in Tokmak, Zaporizhzhia Oblast, Ukrainian SSR, and is Jewish.

Playing career
In 2006, Oberemko attracted interest from Israeli club Beitar Jerusalem. Being Jewish, Oberemko would not count against the clubs' foreign player cap. Kiev demanded $220,000 for Oberemko. Talks eventually stalled, and Oberemko ended up leaving Kiev on a free transfer to FC Kharkiv.

National team
As a member of the Ukraine national under-21 football team, Oberemko competed at the 2006 UEFA European Under-21 Football Championship in Portugal. The team was defeated in the final by the Netherlands.

See also
List of select Jewish football (association; soccer) players

References
 

1984 births
Living people
Ukrainian Jews
Ukrainian footballers
Ukraine under-21 international footballers
Association football midfielders
FC Dynamo Kyiv players
FC Mariupol players
FC Kharkiv players
FC Kryvbas Kryvyi Rih players
FC Vorskla Poltava players
FC Metalist Kharkiv players
Ukrainian Premier League players
Jewish footballers